Neochoraki (Greek: Νεοχωράκι meaning "a little new village") may refer to several villages in Greece:

Neochoraki, Arta, a village in the Arta regional unit 
Neochoraki, Chalkidiki, a village in Chalkidiki 
Neochoraki, Florina, a village in the Florina regional unit
Neochoraki, Magnesia, a village in the Magnesia regional unit 
Neochoraki, Boeotia, a village in Boeotia 
Neochoraki, Corfu a village in Corfu